Baxter is an unincorporated community in Placer County, California. It lies at an elevation of 3891 feet (1186 m).

The place originated as a travelers' rest stop. The Baxter post office opened in 1935. The town was named for Rebecca Clark.

References

Unincorporated communities in California
Unincorporated communities in Placer County, California